The men's middleweight event was part of the boxing programme at the 1952 Summer Olympics. The weight class allowed boxers of up to 75 kilograms to compete. The competition was held from 29 July to 2 August 1952. 23 boxers from 23 nations competed.

Medalists

Results

References

Middleweight